Haruka Enomoto (born 14 September 1996) is a Japanese diver. She competed in the 2017 Summer Universiade, 2017 FINA Diving Grand Prix, and 2021 FINA Diving World Cup. She qualified to represent Japan at the 2020 Summer Olympics.

References

External links 
 Haruka Enomoto of Japan competes in the women's 3m springboard - Getty Images

1996 births
Living people
Japanese female divers
Place of birth missing (living people)
People from Utsunomiya, Tochigi
Sportspeople from Tochigi Prefecture
Olympic divers of Japan
Divers at the 2020 Summer Olympics
21st-century Japanese women